This List of Indian Sportswomen includes the champion sports women that India has ever produced who bought laurels to their mother land by establishing records & winning titles on international stage.

 Anjali Bhagwat, Shooting - Conferred with Rajiv Gandhi Khel Ratna Award, Arjuna Award.
Anju Bobby George, Long Jump
 Apurvi Chandela, Air rifle shooting
 Anisa Sayyed, Shooting
 Anjum Chopra, Cricket - Conferred with Arjuna Award
 Anuradha Biswal, Track and field
 Aparna Popat, Badminton - Conferred with Arjuna Award
 Asha Agarwal, Track and field - Conferred with Arjuna Award
 Ashwini Ponnappa, Badminton - Conferred with Arjuna Award
 Ashwini Nachappa
 Bobby Aloysius, Track and field
 Beenamol, Track and field - Conferred with Rajiv Gandhi Khel Ratna Award, Padma Shri, Arjuna Award.
 Bula Choudhury, Swimming - Conferred with Padma Shri, Arjuna Award.
 Chekrovolu Swuro, Archery - Conferred with Arjuna Award
 Chhanda Gayen, Mountaineering - first Bengali woman to climb Mount Everest
 Dipa Karmakar, Gymnastics - Came fourth in the 2016 Rio Olympics, Conferred with Khel Ratna
Babitha Kumari Phogat, Wrestling
 Deepika Kumari, Archery - Conferred with Arjuna Award
 Deepika Thakur, Hockey - Conferred with Arjuna Award
 Dola Banerjee, Archery - Conferred with Arjuna Award
 Divya Singh, Basketball
 Dronavalli Harika, Chess - Conferred with Arjuna Award
 Dutee Chand, Track and Field
 Esha Singh, Shooting sports
 Geeta Zutshi, Track and field - Conferred with Padma Shri, Arjuna Award.
 Geeta Phogat, Wrestling 
 Geetika Jakhar, Wrestling - Conferred with Arjuna Award
 Joshna Chinappa, Squash
 Harwant Kaur, Track and field
 Hima Das, Track and field
 Jyotirmoyee Sikdar, Track and field - Conferred with Rajiv Gandhi Khel Ratna Award, Padma Shri, Arjuna Award.
 Jhulan Goswami, Cricket - Conferred with Arjuna Award
 Jwala Gutta, Badminton - Conferred with Arjuna Award
 Kamaljeet Sandhu, Track and field - Conferred with Padma Shri
 Kavita Chahal, Boxing - Conferred with Arjuna Award
 Kavita Raut, Track and field
 Koneru Humpy, Chess - Conferred with Padma Shri, Arjuna Award.
 Karnam Malleswari, Weightlifting - Conferred with Rajiv Gandhi Khel Ratna Award, Padma Shri, Arjuna Award, bronze medal in the 2000 Summer Olympics at Sydney lifting 110 kg.
 Kunjarani Devi, Weightlifting - Conferred with Rajiv Gandhi Khel Ratna Award, Arjuna Award.
 Krishna Poonia, Track and field
 Krushnaa Patil, Mountaineering
 Mary D'Souza Sequeira, conferred with Dyan Chand Award, ((Track and Field)) and ((Field Hockey)) First Double International, winner in First Asian Games Silver and Bronze and Gold Second Asian Games. First Indian Woman Contingent to go to Olympics in Helsinki in 1952. Represented India in Internationald World Field Hockey Tournament in Folkestone, UK in 1953, World Field Hockey Tournament in 1956 in Melbourne, Australia and in India vs Japan Test Matches in 1964 in India. Dhyan Chand Award in 2013.
 Mary Kom, Women's boxing - Conferred with Rajiv Gandhi Khel Ratna Award, Padma Shri, Arjuna Award.
 M D Valsamma, Track and field - Conferred with Padma Shri, Arjuna Award.
 Prajusha Maliakkal, Track and field
 Manjeet Kaur, Track and field - Conferred with Arjuna Award
 Madhumita Bisht, Badminton - Conferred with Padma Shri, Arjuna Award.
 Mithali Raj, Cricket - Conferred with Arjuna Award
 Neelam Jaswant Singh, Track and field - Conferred with Arjuna Award
 Neetu Chandra, Taekwondo - First Indian actress to compete in two international games
 Neha Aggarwal, Table tennis
 Nisha Millet, Swimming - Conferred with Arjuna Award
 Prashanti Singh, Basketball - Conferred with Padma Shri, Arjuna Award
 P. V. Sindhu, Badminton - Conferred with Padma Shri, Arjuna Award
 Pinki Pramanik Track and field
 Poulomi Ghatak, Table Tennis - Conferred with Arjuna Award
Pragnya Mohan, Triathlon
 Pritam Rani Siwach, Hockey - Conferred with Arjuna Award
 Rahi Sarnobat, Shooting
 Manu Bhaker, Shooting
 Reeth Abraham, Track and field - Conferred with Arjuna Award
 Tayabun Nisha, Track and field.
 Renubala Chanu, Weightlifting
 Razia Sheikh, Track and field
 Santhi Soundarajan, Track and field - Winner of 11 International Medals for India and 50 for her home state Tamil Nadu. 
 Saina Nehwal, Badminton - Conferred with Rajiv Gandhi Khel Ratna Award, Padma Shri, Arjuna Award.
 Sakshi Malik , Wrestling - Won bronze medal at Rio Olympics 2016.
 Sania Mirza, Tennis - Conferred with Padma Shri, Arjuna Award.
 Sandhya Agarwal, Cricket - Conferred with Arjuna Award
 Sarjubala Devi, Boxer - 2011 AIBA Youth World Boxing Championships gold medalist.
 Sonam Malik, Wrestling
 Shikha Tandon, Swimming - Conferred with Arjuna Award
 Shiny Abraham, Track and field - Conferred with Padma Shri, Arjuna Award.
 J. J. Shobha, Track and field - Conferred with Arjuna Award
 Seema Antil, Track and field
 Soma Biswas, Track and field - Conferred with Arjuna Award
 Stephie D'Souza, Track and field - Conferred with Arjuna Award
 Sumitra Nayak, Rugby
 Sunita Rani, Track and field - Conferred with Padma Shri, Arjuna Award.
 Subbaraman Vijayalakshmi, Chess - Conferred with Arjuna Award
 P. T. Usha, Track and field - Conferred with Padma Shri, Arjuna Award.
 Tania Sachdev, Chess - Conferred with Arjuna Award

See also
List of Mount Everest records of India
Sport in India
Sneh Rana: Woman Cricketer of India

References